Onur Karaman (born 1981) is a Turkish-born Canadian film director and screenwriter. He is best known for his films Where Atilla Passes (Là où Atilla passe) and Breathe (Respire).

Karaman moved to Canada with his family in childhood. He directed a number of short films before releasing The Urban Farm (La ferme des humains) as his full-length feature debut in 2014.

Filmography
Le Ride - 2006
Stations - 2009
R’en-donner - 2010
L'histoire d'un malade - 2011The Urban Farm (La ferme des humains) - 2014Where Atilla Passes (Là où Atilla passe) - 2015Guilt (Le Coupable) - 2019Breathe (Respire) - 2022Emptiness'' - TBA

References

External links

21st-century Canadian screenwriters
Canadian male screenwriters
Canadian screenwriters in French
Film directors from Quebec
Writers from Quebec
Turkish emigrants to Canada
Living people